Thomas von Scheele (born March 13, 1969 in Bollnäs) is a left-handed Swedish table tennis player. He competed in the men's doubles event at the 1996 Summer Olympics.

He won a gold medal in the double event of the World Table Tennis Championships in 1991 with Peter Karlsson. He also won several medals in the European Table Tennis Championships. He later became a coach of Sweden's women table tennis team.

See also
 List of table tennis players

References 

Living people
1969 births
Swedish male table tennis players
People from Bollnäs
Olympic table tennis players of Sweden
Table tennis players at the 1996 Summer Olympics
Sportspeople from Gävleborg County